Lamar John Ryan Cecil (November 2, 1902 – February 14, 1958) was a United States district judge of the United States District Court for the Eastern District of Texas.

Education and career

Born in Houston, Texas, Cecil received a Bachelor of Arts degree from Rice Institute (now Rice University) in 1923 and a Bachelor of Laws from the University of Texas School of Law in 1927. He was in private practice in Beaumont, Texas from 1927 to 1954.

Federal judicial service

On August 31, 1954, Cecil received a recess appointment from President Dwight D. Eisenhower to a new seat on the United States District Court for the Eastern District of Texas created by 68 Stat. 8. Formally nominated to the same seat by President Eisenhower on November 8, 1954, he was confirmed by the United States Senate on December 2, 1954, and received his commission on December 3, 1954. Cecil served in that capacity until his death on February 14, 1958.

References

Sources
 

1902 births
1958 deaths
Rice University alumni
University of Texas School of Law alumni
Judges of the United States District Court for the Eastern District of Texas
United States district court judges appointed by Dwight D. Eisenhower
20th-century American judges
20th-century American lawyers